The Magical Brush (Chinese: 神笔马良) is a 2014 Chinese animated fantasy film directed by Frankie Chung. It was released on 25 July 2014.

Cast
Shao Yichen
Meng Xianglong
Hong Haitian
Leo Wu
Guo Yifeng
Wu Wenlun

Reception

Box office
The film earned  at the Chinese box office.

References

2014 films
2010s adventure films
2014 fantasy films
Chinese animated fantasy films